The 1947–48 Brown Bears men's ice hockey season was the 23rd season of play for the program but first under the oversight of the NCAA. The Bears represented Brown University and were coached by Westcott Moulton, in his 1st season.

Season
After a 9-year absence, Brown returned to the ice with Westcott Moulton (class of 1931) now helming the program. The Bears were predictably having to contend with a lack of experienced players but, with the Rhode Island Auditorium still at their disposal, Brown could still get practice time regardless of the weather conditions. The first game for the Bruins came against Harvard who, though no longer the preeminent power, were still a tough team to beat. The Bears showed up well and kept the contest close, ending regulation with a 5–5 tie. The 10-minute overtime, however, demonstrated just how far the Brunos still had to go. Harvard was able to score 5 additional goals in the extra session which were mostly attributed to Brown's lack of depth. The team performed nearly as well in their second game when they rallied from a 2–5 deficit in the third to end just 1 goal shy of a tie. The same trend continued in Brown's third game when the Bears kept the game close only to see Princeton pull away late.

Brown didn't play against until after returning from the winter break. In the interim, Moulton was able to put together a third line with new addition Rod Scheffer teaming with Henry Healy and Charlie Bryant wihle Warren Howard took over as the starter in goal. Unfortunately, they were met at home by one of the top teams in the nation. Boston University had little sympathy for the returning Bears and throttled Brown 2–13. Near the end of the game the Bruins, unable to match the offensive punch of the Terriers, fought back in the only way they could when Ned Dewey got into a fight with Don Cleary. While it had no impact on the outcome of the game, the scuffle buoyed the team for their match with Colby. The inspired Bears tore through the Mules and posted their first win on the season in dominating fashion.

There was renewed hope after the victory and Brown was looking for revenge against Harvard. Unfortunately, just like the BU game, very little went right for the Bears. The Crimson squad eviscerated Brown to the tune of 3–17, posting the most goals scored against the Brunos in program history (still a record as of 2022). The only consolation in the game was that star center Fred Nelson was able to keep his scoring streak alive.

Unbowed by the severe defeat, Brown played well in the next game against Fort Devens State. While the score was close, it was only through the efforts of Chiefs' netminder Hal Downes. Brown was obviously the better team throughout the game and were able to post their second win of the season. After an unfortunate but predictable loss to the best team in the country, Dartmouth, Brown headed to West Point for their final game before the semester break. Leading up to the game the Bears were unable to practice due to the Ice Capades being at the Auditorium. That and the fact that it was the third road game that week made the Bears sluggish and unable to counter a fairly strong Cadet team. Brown entered the examination period with a disappointing 2–6 mark but had played far better than their record indicated.

The Bruins went down the home stretch of their season with three games in four days after the break. Joining the team were newcomers George Menard, Dan Rawson and Jim Ferry. After a strong win over MIT, the Bruins stunned Yale with an 8–7 win. The winning streak was ended by Cal goaltender Ian Watson who stymied the Bears for much of the match. Menard proved himself to be a great addition to the team when he played the entire game against New Hampshire and scored the Bears' final two goals in the match. The Bears ended the season with a narrow defeat to MIT, however, despite the poor record the year was seen as a success; Brown had won several games and even in some of their losses they did not look out of place with some of the college hockey regulars.

Roster

Note: John Kimball, Robert Shaughnessy and Frank Sternberg are listed as being members of the team but do not appear to have played in any of the games.

Standings

Schedule and results

|-
!colspan=12 style=";" | Regular Season

Scoring statistics

References

Brown Bears men's ice hockey seasons
Brown
Brown
Brown